Parramatta Power Soccer Club, an association football club based in Parramatta, Sydney, was founded in 1999. They were admitted into the National Soccer League for the 1999–2000 season. They dissolved in 2004 as the National Soccer League became defunct.

Ahmad Elrich held the record for the greatest number of appearances for Parramatta Power. The Australian midfielder played 120 times for the club. The club's goalscoring record was held by John Buonavoglia who scored 23 goals.

Key
 The list is ordered first by date of debut, and then if necessary in alphabetical order.
 Appearances as a substitute are included.

Players

References
General
 
 

Specific

Parramatta Power SC players
Parramatta Power
Association football player non-biographical articles